Cotherstone Castle was in the village of Cotherstone by the River Tees some  north-east of Barnard Castle in County Durham, England.

This was a motte and bailey castle built around 1090. In 1200 the wooden building was replaced by a stone building, of which was licensed on 2 March 1201. The remains include an earth mound, a ruined wall fragment and traces of a probable fishpond.

See also
Castles in Great Britain and Ireland
List of castles in England

References
Cotherstone Castle
Fry, Plantagenet Somerset, The David & Charles Book of Castles, David & Charles, 1980. 

Castles in County Durham